Tagesse Chafo (Amharic: ታገሰ ጫፎ) is an Ethiopian politician and current Speaker of the House of Peoples Representatives. He was elected as speaker on 18 October 2018 succeeding Muferiat Kamil who became the Minister of Peace. He was re-elected as the Speaker of the House of Peoples' Representatives on 4 October 2021.

Prior to becoming Speaker, Tagesse was the Minister for Public Service.

References

Speakers of the House of Peoples' Representatives (Ethiopia)
Government ministers of Ethiopia
Year of birth missing (living people)
Living people
21st-century Ethiopian politicians